The SNCF Class BB 27300 is an electric locomotive. There are 67 BB 27300 locomotives, built as part of the Prima range by Alstom. The first BB 27300 were delivered starting in 2006. Painted in the blue and white livery of Transilien, the brand name for the SNCF network around Paris, these locomotives are the passenger equivalent of the freight-only SNCF Class BB 27000 and are equipped for push-pull operation on suburban passenger services in the Île-de-France region around Paris, working with refurbished VB2N double-deck carriages.

Technical information

The locomotive is equipped with a train protection system derived from the contrôle de vitesse par balises system : the KVBP.

It is also equipped with two pantographs, one dedicated to the 1500 V direct current, the other to the 25000 V alternating current.

History 

Orders
The first batch of 60 locomotives was ordered in 2004, and following testing of the first two units in 2005, delivered progressively into 2008. Follow-up orders for five and two locomotives respectively were placed. The locomotives are numbered in series from 27301-27367, although the number carried on the locomotive is prefixed with the number 8, to denote the unit as belonging to the Île-de-France division of SNCF.

Usage
The first locomotives entered service in 2006 on suburban trains from Paris Montparnasse railway station. Current deployment sees a total of 25 locomotives operating services from Paris-Montparnasse on trains to Dreux, Mantes-la-Jolie and Rambouillet. At Montparnasse they have displaced older SNCF Class BB 8500 and BB 25500 locomotives. A further 42 locomotives operate from Paris Saint-Lazare railway station on trains to Poissy, Mantes-la-Jolie, Pontoise, Gisors, and Ermont Eaubonne. At Saint-Lazare BB 8500 and BB 17000 locomotives have been displaced.

Future
The usage of BB 27300 locomotives on suburban passenger services is a temporary measure. It is expected that sometime after 2015 they will begin to be replaced by new Electric Multiple Units. When this happens, the locomotives are likely to find further use with SNCF's freight subsidiary, SNCF Fret, where they will join the technically similar BB 27000 locomotives.

References

Alstom Prima electric locomotives
Bo′Bo′ locomotives
27300
1500 V DC locomotives
25 kV AC locomotives
Standard gauge electric locomotives of France
Railway locomotives introduced in 2004
Multi-system locomotives
Passenger locomotives